was a town located in Tōhaku District, Tottori Prefecture, Japan.

As of 2003, the town had an estimated population of 7,770 and a density of 371.41 persons per km2. The total area was 20.92 km2.

On October 1, 2005, Hōjō, along with the town of Daiei (also from Tōhaku District), was merged to create the town of Hokuei.

External links
Hokuei official website 

Dissolved municipalities of Tottori Prefecture
Populated places disestablished in 2005
2005 disestablishments in Japan
Tōhaku District, Tottori
Hokuei, Tottori